John Watson Cary (February 11, 1817March 29, 1895) was an American lawyer and politician.  He served as the 9th Mayor of Racine, Wisconsin, and was a member of the Wisconsin State Senate and the Wisconsin State Assembly.

Biography
John Watson Cary was born in Shoreham, Vermont, the eighth of nine children born to Asa and Anna (Sanford) Cary. His family moved to western New York around 1831. He graduated from Union College and was admitted to the bar in 1844. He moved to Racine, Wisconsin, in 1850 and to Milwaukee in 1859.

Cary died in Chicago's Victoria Hotel in 1895.

Career
Cary was a member of the Senate from 1853 to 1854 and was Mayor of Racine in 1857. He was a member of the Milwaukee City Council in 1868 and was elected to represent Milwaukee's first ward in the State Assembly in 1872. Cary was a Democrat.

Cary was most well known for his legal career.  He was the chief legal counsel to the Chicago, Milwaukee, and St. Paul Railroad for 36 years, from 1859 until his death.  He was seen as an extremely accomplished lawyer, having successfully argued many cases before the Supreme Court of the United States.

Personal life and family
Cary married his first wife, Eliza Vilas, on July 10, 1844.  Eliza died due to complications from the birth of their daughter in 1845.

On June 6, 1847, Cary married his second wife, Isabel Brinkerhoff.  They had seven children together.

Cary's lineage can be traced back to the 12th century Lord Adam De Kari in Somersetshire, England.  The 14th century MP John Cary of Devon was also an ancestor.  His first American ancestor was also named John Cary and arrived in the Massachusetts Bay Colony in 1634.

References

External links

People from Shoreham, Vermont
Politicians from Milwaukee
Democratic Party Wisconsin state senators
Democratic Party members of the Wisconsin State Assembly
Mayors of Racine, Wisconsin
Union College (New York) alumni
1817 births
1895 deaths
19th-century American politicians